Alfred Bachelet (26 February 1864 – 10 February 1944) was a French composer, conductor and teacher.

Biography 
Born in Paris, Bachelet studied at the Conservatoire de Paris with Ernest Guiraud and obtained the second Grand Prix de Rome in 1890 with his cantata Cléopâtre after a text by Fernand Beissier. He was conductor of the choir in 1907, then conductor of the Paris Opera. He served as director of the Nancy Conservatory from 1919 until his death in 1944. He was elected to the Académie des Beaux-Arts in 1929.

Bachelet died in Nancy on 10 February 1944.

Selected works 
 Chère nuit, lied, 1897
 Scemo, opera, 1914
 Quand la cloche sonnera (libretto by Yoris d'Hansewick and Pierre de Wattyne) opera, 1922
 Un jardin sur l'Oronte (libretto by Franc-Nohain after Maurice Barrès), opera, 1932
 Fantaisie nocturne, ballet
 Sûryâh, symphonic poem

References

External links 
 

1864 births
1944 deaths
20th-century French conductors (music)
20th-century French male musicians
French opera composers
French male classical composers
French male conductors (music)
Musicians from Paris
Conservatoire de Paris alumni
Members of the Académie des beaux-arts
Prix de Rome for composition